Robert Abell was born in about 1605 in Stapenhill, Derbyshire, England. He emigrated to New England in 1630 as part of the first wave of the Great Migration, and was among the early settlers of the Massachusetts Bay Colony, settling first in Weymouth, and subsequently in Rehoboth, where he died on June 20, 1663.

Family background
Robert was the second son of George Abell (1561–1630) and Frances Cotton (b. abt. 1573-d. by 1646). On his mother's side, he was descended from a long line of English, Norman and French aristocrats and royalty.

Robert's father, George Abell, at the age of 17 enrolled in Oxford University’s Brasenose College (8 December 1578). By November of 1580, he had become a barrister and a member of the Inner Temple. Before June 1630, he arranged an apprenticeship in London for his son, but Robert decided to try his luck in the New World, instead. This was a move that his father disapproved of, but, nevertheless, financed.

In his will, dated 8 September 1630, George Abell states (original spelling retained), "I bequeath unto my second sonne Robert Abell onelie a Twentie shilling peece for his childs parte in regard of ye charges I have beene at in placeing him in a good trade in London wch hee hath made noe use of and since in furnishing him for newe England where I hope he now is."

New Life in America
Robert Abell's first recorded act in America (19 October 1630) was to apply to be a freeman in the recently founded village of Weymouth. On 18 May 1631, he took the freeman's oath.

During his time as a resident of Weymouth (1630–1643), his civic duties included serving on various types of juries (grand, petit and coroner's), and records indicate that he accumulated a small amount of land (about 7 acres). Like many immigrants, Robert Abell did not stay indefinitely in the first place he landed. In 1643, when the opportunity to join a newly founded town presented itself, he followed Reverend Samuel Newman (and the majority of his congregation) to a place the local Wampanoag tribe called Seekonk (a portion of which was later renamed “Rehoboth”).

At the time of his death, Abell's estate “amounted to £354 17s. 9d. of which ‘an house and land’ accounted for £130.”

Second Generation of Robert Abell’s Family
Robert Abell and his wife Joanna (who after Robert's death married William Hyde, and d. aft. 1682) [Abell, Horace A. The Abell family in America, p. 43] had ten children: Abraham (d.1639), Mary (1642–1724), Preserved (b. ca. 1644), Caleb (b. ca. 1647), Joshua (b. ca. 1649), Benjamin (b. ca. 1651), Experience (b. ca. 1660), Samuel (1650-1698), James (1656-1724), and Mehitalbe (b. ca. 1655).

 Circa 1662, their daughter Mary married Reverend Samuel Luther (1636–1716), son of an adventurous mariner named Captain John Luther (d.1645), “a focal figure in the colonies mentioned several times in Winthrop's Journal and other colonial accounts.” Robert Abell's new son-in-law was already famous in New England for having survived a massacre and kidnapping by a small group of Lenape tribesmen when he was only nine years old (1645) and went on to become (1685) the highly respected “settled pastor” of the First Baptist Church (still extant) of Swansea, Massachusetts for 31 years.
 Mary's sister Experience married (1680) Deacon John Baldwin (1654–1705), an early settler of Lebanon, Connecticut, with whom she had five children.
 Robert's son Lieutenant Preserved Abell (d. 1724) was among those soldiers listed as having not only “served under Major [William] Bradford (1624-1703)” in King Philip's War, but also “advanced money to sustain it.” (£7, 15s, 1d.)
 Sergeant Caleb Abell (d. 1731) moved to Norwich, Connecticut in 1668 and was a selectman in 1682, constable in 1684 and 1706, townsman in 1689 and was Sergeant of the Norwich Train Band in 1701. “In the book of Grants in Norwich, there are 38 or more items to Caleb Abell.”
 Joshua Abell (d. 1725) “was constable in Dedham, Massachusetts and frequently chosen townsman there. He moved to Norwich, Connecticut in 1667 and became a ‘considerable landowner,’ with 44 grants listed in his name.”
 Benjamin Abell (d.1699) also held substantial property adjacent to or near his older brothers in Norwich.

All of the Abell brothers had sizable families (seven to ten children each), helping to perpetuate the family name in New England. Writing in 1940, genealogist Horace Abell claimed that “probably all the present day Abells of New England stock are descended from Robert’s three sons, Preserved, Caleb and Benjamin Abell. His fourth son, Joshua, did not leave any male descendants.”

Notes

Bibliography
 Abell, Horace Avery and Abell, Lewis Parker The Abell family in America: Robert Abell of Rehoboth, Mass., His English Ancestry and His Descendants, other Abell families and immigrants, Abell families in England. Tuttle Publishing Company, Rutland, VT: 1940.
 Anderson, Robert Charles. The Great Migration Begins: Immigrants to New England, 1620-1633. Vol. 1–3. Boston, MA: New England Historic Genealogical Society, 1995.
 Anderson, Virginia DeJohn. New England's Generation: The Great Migration and the Formation of Society and Culture in the Seventeenth Century. Cambridge University Press, Cambridge, UK: 1991. 
 Arnold, James N. Vital Record of Rehoboth, 1642-1896. Providence, RI: Narragansett Historical Publishing, 1897.
 Banks, Charles Edward. The Winthrop Fleet of 1630: An Account of the Vessels, the Voyage, the Passengers and their English Homes, from Original Authorities. 1930. 
 Bliss, Leonard. The History of Rehoboth, Bristol County, Massachusetts: Comprising a History of the Present Towns of Rehoboth, Seekonk, and Pawtucket, from Their Settlement to the Present Time; Together with Sketches of Attleborough, Cumberland, and a Part of Swansey and Barrington, to the Time that They Were Severally Separated from the Original Town. Boston, MA: Otis, Broaders, & Co., 1836
 Boyer, Carl. Medieval English ancestors of Robert Abell: Who died in Rehoboth, Plymouth Colony, 20 June 1663: with English ancestral lines of other colonial Americans. C. Boyer, 2001.
 Cooke, William Henry. Students admitted to the Inner Temple, 1571-1625. London: F. Cartwright, 1868.
 Finley, R. Mainwaring. A Short History of the Mainwaring Family. London: Griffith, Farran, Okeden & Welsh, 1890.
 Fischer, David Hackett. Albion's Seed: Four British Folkways in America. New York, NY: Oxford University Press, 1989. 
 Rider, Fremont. American Genealogical-Biographical Index. Middletown, CT, USA: Godfrey Memorial Library.
 Luther, Leslie L. and George A. Luther. The Luther genealogy: a history of the descendants of Captain John Luther who arrived in the Massachusetts Bay Colony, 1630-1635. Lakeland, FL: G.A. Luther, 2001.
 Mosley, Charles, editor, Burke's Peerage, Baronetage & Knightage, 107th Edition, 3 Volumes. Wilmington, DE: Burke's Peerage (Genealogical Books) Ltd, 2003.
 Pope, Charles Henry. The Pioneers of Massachusetts: A Descriptive List, Drawn from Records of the Colonies, Towns, and Churches, and Other Contemporaneous Documents. Baltimore, MD: Genealogical Pub. Co., 1998. Originally published in 1900. 
 Richardson, Douglas, and Kimball G. Everingham, Magna Carta Ancestry: A Study in Colonial and Medieval Families. Baltimore, MD: Genealogical Pub. Co., 2005. 
 Richardson, Douglas, Kimball G. Everingham, and David Faris. Plantagenet Ancestry: A Study in Colonial and Medieval Families. Baltimore, MD: Genealogical Pub. Co., 2004. 
 Roberts, Gary Boyd. The Royal Descents of 600 Immigrants to the American Colonies or the United States Who Were Themselves Notable or Left Descendants Notable in American History. Baltimore, MD: Genealogical Publishing Co., 2004. 
 Roberts, Gary Boyd, Julie Helen Otto, and New England Historic Genealogical Society. Ancestors of American Presidents. 3rd Edition. Boston, MA: C. Boyer, 1989. 
 Savage, James. A Genealogical Dictionary of the First Settlers of New England: Showing Three Generations of Those who Came Before May, 1692, on the Basis of Farmer's Register. Vol. 1–4. Boston, MA: Little, Brown & Co., 1862.
 Thompson, Neil D. "Abell-Cotton-Mainwaring: Maternal Ancestry of Robert Abell of Weymouth and Rehoboth, Mass," The Genealogist, Vol 5, No 2 (Fall 1984): 158–71, 9 (1988): 89
 Weis, Frederick Lewis and Walter Lee Shepard, Jr.; William R. Beall and Kaleen E. Beall, eds. Ancestral Roots of Certain American Colonists Who Came to America Before 1700: Lineages from Alfred the Great, Charlemagne, Malcolm of Scotland, Robert the Strong, and other Historical Individuals. Baltimore, MD: Genealogical Publishing Co., 2004. 
 Winthrop, John. Winthrop's Journal, "History of New England" 1630-1649. Vol. 1 & 2. New York, NY: Charles Scribner's Sons, 1908.

External links
 Great Migration Study Project 
 Luther Family Association 
 Winthrop Society 
 Order of the Crown of Charlemagne in the United States of America 
 The National Society Magna Charta Dames and Barons 

1600s births
1663 deaths
American Puritans
People of colonial Massachusetts
New England Puritanism
English emigrants